Brachylagus coloradoensis is an extinct species of lagomorph closely related to the pygmy rabbit (Brachylagus idahoensis). Its fossils have been found in Early and Middle Pleistocene deposits in Colorado.

Description
Brachylagus coloradoensis was slightly larger than the living pygmy rabbit. Its enamel patterns show intermediate characteristics between the pygmy rabbit and the extinct genus Hypolagus, which suggests that Brachylagus evolved from the latter.

References

Prehistoric lagomorphs
Prehistoric mammals of North America
Pleistocene mammals of North America
Leporidae